Svend Ove Pedersen (31 October 1920 – 3 August 2009) was a Danish rower who competed in the 1952 Summer Olympics.

He was born in Frederiksværk and was the father of Egon Pedersen.

In 1952, he was a crew member of the Danish boat which won the bronze medal in the coxed pairs event.

External links
 Svend Pedersen's profile at Sports Reference.com
 Svend Pedersen's obituary 

1920 births
2009 deaths
Danish male rowers
Olympic rowers of Denmark
Rowers at the 1952 Summer Olympics
Olympic bronze medalists for Denmark
Olympic medalists in rowing
Medalists at the 1952 Summer Olympics
People from Frederiksværk
Sportspeople from the Capital Region of Denmark